Pope Victor has been the papal name of three popes of the Catholic Church.

 Pope Victor I (189–199)
 Pope Victor II (1055–1057)
 Pope Victor III (1086–1087)

There were also two antipopes called Victor IV.

 Antipope Victor IV (1138)
 Antipope Victor IV (1159–1164)

See also 

 List of popes

Victor